Brothel may also refer to:

Brothel (film), 2008 film by Amy Waddell
The Brothel, 1888 painting by Vincent van Gogh
The Brothel, 2010 album by the Norwegian artist Susanne Sundfør